There are several theorems known as the Helmholtz theorem:

 Helmholtz decomposition, also known as the fundamental theorem of vector calculus
 Helmholtz reciprocity in optics
 Helmholtz theorem (classical mechanics)
 Helmholtz's theorems in fluid mechanics
 Helmholtz minimum dissipation theorem

See also
 Helmholtz–Thévenin theorem